Marcus Walker (born 12 August 2002) is an English professional rugby league footballer who plays as a  or  for the Newcastle Thunder in the Betfred Championship.

He previously played for Hull FC in the Betfred Super League, and spent time on loan from Hull at Whitehaven in the Championship.

In 2021 he made his Hull début in the Super League against the Catalans Dragons on the 13th August after previously being named on the bench but not playing for the home game against the Huddersfield Giants. In 2022 he had a loan spell at Whitehaven RLFC.

References

External links
Hull FC profile

2002 births
Living people
English rugby league players
Hull F.C. players
Newcastle Thunder players
Rugby league players from Yorkshire
Whitehaven R.L.F.C. players